Oscar Harris (born 30 November 1943) is a Surinamese singer. He was among the best known Surinamese musicians in the Netherlands during the 1970s and 1980s.

Harris moved to Amsterdam to study architecture in 1963, and founded Oscar Harris and The Twinkle Stars, a ten-man vocal and instrumental group in 1965, which became known by playing at student gatherings in Amsterdam. In 1968 the group was signed to the artist roster of Omega Records and Blue Elephant, with a tour of South America in 1971. 

In 1974, Harris went solo with the single "Alta Gracia", commencing a series of hit-singles up to 1988. He had also recorded some hits in Indonesia, including "Sandy" and "Oh Tuhan".

In 2015 TopNotch released a compilation CD in the Sranan Gowtu-series (Surinamese Gold) devoted to Surinamese artists, mainly from the 1970s.

Discography
1969  Try a little love
1969  Soldiers prayer
1974  2
1974  A day will come
1974  Alta Gracia
1975  Sing your freedom song
1977  De beste
1978  One of a kind
1980  Song for the children
1981  Best
1982  It takes two
1983  Everybody loves somebody
1984  Take good care of her
1987  With lots of love
1988  Love for the world
2004  Salsa romantica
2005  Dutch rare groove
2009  Shalom Salam (i.s.m. Flower to the People)
2010  Song for Pakistan Faith Hope and Love (i.s.m. Flower to the People)

References

1943 births
Living people
People from Marowijne District
20th-century Surinamese male singers
Nationaal Songfestival contestants